The enzyme glycerophosphocholine cholinephosphodiesterase (EC 3.1.4.38) is an enzyme that catalyzes the reaction

sn-glycero-3-phosphocholine + H2O = glycerol + phosphocholine

This enzyme belongs to the family of hydrolases, specifically those acting on phosphoric diester bonds.  The systematic name  is sn-glycero-3-phosphocholine cholinephosphohydrolase. This enzyme is also called L-3-glycerylphosphinicocholine cholinephosphohydrolase.

Structural studies

As of late 2007, only one structure has been solved for this class of enzymes, with the PDB accession code .

References

 

EC 3.1.4
Enzymes of known structure